

Woodlands Wines is an Australian winery at Wilyabrup, in the Margaret River wine region of Western Australia.  Established in 1973 by David and Heather Watson, it held its first vintage in 1978, and by the end of 1982 had won trophies at wine shows in Mount Barker, Perth and Canberra with its "Andrew" Cabernet Sauvignon 1981.

In the latter part of the 1980s and the early 1990s, Woodlands sold all of its harvest to other Margaret River wineries.  In 1999, the Watsons began a major expansion program.  Two years later, Woodlands opened a cellar door, and rejuvenated its own label.

Since then, Woodlands wines have received international acclaim; in annual blind tastings against Bordeaux wines of the same vintage, the Woodlands Margaret Reserve Cabernet Merlot has consistently been rated at or near the top.

See also

 Australian wine
 List of wineries in Western Australia
 Western Australian wine

References

Notes

Bibliography

External links
Woodlands Wines – official site

Wineries in Western Australia
Wilyabrup, Western Australia
Agriculture companies established in 1973
Food and drink companies established in 1973
Australian companies established in 1973